The 1982–83 season was PAOK Football Club's 56th in existence and the club's 24th consecutive season in the top flight of Greek football. The team entered the Greek Football Cup in first round and also participated in the UEFA Cup.

Players

Squad

Transfers

Players transferred in

Players transferred out

Kit

Pre-season

Competitions

Overview

Alpha Ethniki

Standings

Results summary

Results by round

Matches

Greek Cup

First round

Additional round

Second round

Third round

Quarter-finals

Semi-finals

Final

UEFA Cup

First round

Second round

Statistics

Squad statistics

! colspan="13" style="background:#DCDCDC; text-align:center" | Goalkeepers
|-

! colspan="13" style="background:#DCDCDC; text-align:center" | Defenders
|-

	

! colspan="13" style="background:#DCDCDC; text-align:center" | Midfielders
|-

! colspan="13" style="background:#DCDCDC; text-align:center" | Forwards
|-

|}	

Source: Match reports in competitive matches, rsssf.com

Goalscorers

Source: Match reports in competitive matches, rsssf.com

External links
 www.rsssf.com
 PAOK FC official website

References 

PAOK FC seasons
PAOK